TFX may refer to:

 TFX Program, a fighter aircraft requirement for the United States that led to the General Dynamics F-111 Aardvark
 TFX (video game), a combat flight simulation game (full title TFX: Tactical Fighter eXperiment)
 Tokyo Financial Exchange (TFX), a futures exchange for trading futures contracts
 TAI TFX, a proposed fighter aircraft for Turkish Air Force service
 TFX, a power supply specification
 TFX (TV channel), French TV channel, previously NT1